Honkytonkville is the twenty-second studio album by American country music singer George Strait, released in June 10, 2003 by MCA Nashville. One of only a few albums of his career not to produce a Number One single, the album was certified platinum by the RIAA. It produced the singles "Tell Me Something Bad About Tulsa", "Cowboys Like Us" and "Desperately", at #11, #2 and #6 respectively on the country charts. "Honk If You Honky Tonk" also charted at #45 based on unsolicited airplay.

"She Used to Say That to Me" was originally recorded by Jim Lauderdale on his 1997 album, Whisper.  "Tell Me Something Bad About Tulsa" was originally recorded by Merle Haggard on his 1986 album Out Among The Stars. "Desperately" was originally recorded by Bruce Robison on his 1998 album Wrapped.

Track listing

Personnel
As listed in liner notes.

Musicians
Eddie Bayers - drums
Stuart Duncan - fiddle, mandolin
Paul Franklin - steel guitar
Steve Gibson - acoustic guitar
Wes Hightower - background vocals
Chris Leuzinger - electric guitar
Brent Mason - electric guitar, nylon string guitar
Steve Nathan - keyboards
Matt Rollings - keyboards
Marty Slayton - background vocals
George Strait - lead vocals
Biff Watson - acoustic guitar
Glenn Worf - bass guitar, upright bass
Strings performed by the Nashville String Machine contracted by Carl Gorodetzky, conducted and arranged by Bergen White.

Chart performance

Weekly charts

Year-end charts

Singles

References

2003 albums
George Strait albums
MCA Records albums
Albums produced by Tony Brown (record producer)